Elk County is the name of several places:

 Elk County, Kansas 
 Elk County, Pennsylvania
 Ełk County, a county (powiat) in Poland.